Xanthosoma sagittifolium, the arrowleaf elephant ear, arrowleaf elephant's ear, malanga or American taro, is a species of tropical flowering plant in the genus Xanthosoma, which produces an edible, starchy corm. Cultivars with purple stems or leaves are also variously called blue taro, purplestem taro, purplestem tannia, and purple elephant's ear among others. Taro is a different species that belongs to the genus Colocasia.

Uses

The tuber (called  or ) is also used in the cuisine of these countries. The plant is often interplanted within reforestation areas to control weeds and provide shade during the early stages of growth.

In Puerto Rican cuisine and Dominican cuisine, the plant and its corm are called yautía. In Puerto Rican pasteles, yautía is ground with squash, potato, green bananas and plantains into a dough-like fluid paste containing pork and ham, and boiled in a banana leaf or paper wrapper.  The yautía corm is used in stews, soups, or simply served boiled much like a potato. It is used in local dishes such as guanime, alcapurrias, sancocho, and mondongo. In alcapurrias, it is also ground with green bananas and made into fried croquettes containing picadillo or sea food. Yautía majada is also prepared and consumed when mashed in some instances. Yauíta puree is usually served with fish or shell fish cooked in coconut milk.

In Suriname and the Netherlands, the plant is called tayer. The shredded root is baked with chicken, fruit juices, salted meat, and spices in the popular Surinamese dish, pom.  Eaten over rice or on bread, pom is commonly eaten in Suriname at family gatherings and on special occasions, and is also popular throughout the Netherlands. In Surinamese cuisine the leaves are also often baked with a Maggi-cube (chicken boullion cube) and eaten alongside rice and chicken or salted beef.

References

External links
 FAO Species Profile: Xanthosoma sagittifolium
 

sagittifolium
Root vegetables
Flora of South America
Flora of the Atlantic Forest
Crops originating from Mexico